The Tiejer Flue is a mountain of the Plessur Alps, located between Arosa and Davos in the canton of Graubünden. It is the main summit between the Maienfelder Furgga and the Strelapass.

References

External links
 Tiejer Flue on Hikr

Mountains of the Alps
Mountains of Graubünden
Mountains of Switzerland
Two-thousanders of Switzerland